En rastlös själ (A restless soul) is the fifth studio album by Swedish singer/songwriter Nanne Grönvall, released in October 2010.

Track listing 

All tracks were produced by Nanne herself, except for:
"I natt är jag din" was produced by Nanne together with her husband Peter Grönvall
"Otacksamhet" was produced by Paul Rein and Peter Grönvall
"Himlen är oskyldigt blå" was produced by Tommy Ekman and Kim Wessel

References 

2010 albums
Nanne Grönvall albums